Hosawal is a village in Dharwad district of Karnataka, India.

Demographics 
As of the 2011 Census of India there were 95 households in Hosawal and a total population of 489 consisting of 266 males and 223 females. There were 82 children ages 0-6.

References

Villages in Dharwad district